Where Wildness Grows is the second studio album by English indie rock band Gengahr. It was released on 9 March 2018 under Transgressive Records.

Singles
On 21 September 2017, Gengahr announced the first single from the album, "Carrion". The second single, along with the announce of the new album, "Mallory" was released on 16 October 2017. On 9 November 2017, the music video for "Mallory" was released. On 18 January 2018, the third single "Before Sunrise" was released.

Critical reception
Where Wildness Grows was met with "generally favourable" reviews from critics. At Metacritic, which assigns a weighted average rating out of 100 to reviews from mainstream publications, this release received an average score of 62, based on 7 reviews.

Accolades

Track listing

References

2018 albums
Transgressive Records albums